Cyril Thomas Howe Plant, Baron Plant, CBE (27 August 1910 – 9 August 1986) was a British trade unionist.

Born in Leek, Staffordshire, he worked as a sorting clerk in the Post Office and spent a lot of time playing football, later becoming a referee. 

In 1934, he joined the Inland Revenue and became a founding member of the Inland Revenue Staff Federation, and was elected to its executive. In 1944, he became the union's full-time assistant secretary, then deputy secretary, before becoming its general secretary in 1960. 

He was elected to the General Council of the Trades Union Congress (TUC) in 1964, and was its President in 1975. He was active in the International Labour Office, and served on its governing body from 1969 to 1977. He served on the Community Relations Commission, the Monopolies and Mergers Commission, as Treasurer of the Workers' Educational Association and Chairman of the Governors of Ruskin College, Oxford. Plant retired from his union posts in 1977 and became an advisor to the Police Federation. 

Plant was appointed an Officer of the Order of the British Empire (OBE) in the 1965 Birthday Honours and promoted to a Commander (CBE) in the 1975 Birthday Honours. On 9 May 1978, he was created a life peer taking the title Baron Plant, of Benenden in the County of Kent.

References

1910 births
1986 deaths
Commanders of the Order of the British Empire
General secretaries of the Inland Revenue Staff Federation
Life peers
People from Leek, Staffordshire
Presidents of the Trades Union Congress
Place of death missing
Trade unionists from Staffordshire
Life peers created by Elizabeth II